Ezra Stoller (16 May 1915 – 29 October 2004) was an American architectural photographer.

Early life
Stoller was born in Chicago, IL. but was raised and schooled in New York. His interest in photography began while he was an architecture student at New York University, when he began making lantern slides and photographs of architectural models, drawings and sculpture. After his graduation in 1938, with a BFA in Industrial Design, he concentrated on photography.

Career
Stoller worked with the photographer Paul Strand in the Office of emergency management in 1940/1. He was drafted in 1942 and deployed at the Army Signal Corps Photo Center where he taught photography. After WW2 he resumed work as an architectural photographer and worked with the leading architects of the day. His work featured landmarks of modern architecture, including Ludwig Mies van der Rohe's Seagram Building, Frank Lloyd Wright's Fallingwater, Alvar Aalto's Finnish Pavilion at the 1939 New York World's Fair, and Eero Saarinen's last project Bell Labs Holmdel Complex.  Stoller is often cited in aiding the spread of the Modern Movement. Among architects, his name was sometimes used as a verb; to have a design “Stollerized” was seen as a great honour.

In 1961, he was the first recipient of a Gold Medal for Photography from the American Institute of Architects and he was awarded an Honorary Doctorate of Fine Arts by Pratt Institute in 1998. Photographs are featured in the books Modern Architecture: Photographs by Ezra Stoller and Ezra Stoller, Photographer. His work was published in Architectural Record, Architectural Forum, Fortune, House & Garden, and House Beautiful, amongst other magazines and his photographs appeared in many books. Works by Stoller are held in various collections, for example, the San Francisco Museum of Modern Art and the Whitney Museum of American Art, and photographs attributed to Stoller are held in the Conway Library at The Courtauld Institute of Art in London whose archive, of primarily architectural images, is being digitised under the wider Courtauld Connects programme.

In the 1960s Stoller founded Esto Photographics, a commercial photography firm now run by his daughter Erica Stoller who is its director. Stoller's son Evan Stoller is an architect and designer of a line of architecturally influenced modern furniture called Stoller Works.

Death
He died in Williamstown, Massachusetts, on 29 October 2004, from complications of a stroke. He was survived by his wife Helen, daughter Erica and two sons, Evan and Lincoln.

Exhibitions
Solo exhibits

Max Protetch Gallery, New York, 1980 
James Danziger Gallery, New York, 1998  
James Danziger Gallery, New York, 1999 
Rolf Ricke Gallery, Cologne, 2000 
Ariel Meyerowitz Gallery, New York, 2001  
Henry Urbach Architecture Gallery, New York, 2002 
Henry Urbach Architecture Gallery, New York, 2004 
Williams College Museum of Art, Williamstown MA, 2004 
Danziger Projects, Summer 2007 
Yossi Milo Gallery, New York, 2011

Group exhibits

Canadian Centre for Architecture, Montreal
San Francisco Museum of Modern Art, San Francisco

Selected publications 
 The John Hancock Center, photographs by Ezra Stoller ; introduction by Yasmin Sabina Khan, New York : Princeton Architectural Press, 2000, 
 The TWA Terminal, photographs by Ezra Stoller ; introduction by Mark Lamster,New York : Princeton Architectural Press, 1999, 
 The Yale Art + Architecture Building, photographs by Ezra Stoller ; introduction by Philip Nobel, New York : Princeton Architectural Press, 1999, 
 Frank Lloyd Wright's Taliesin West, photographs by Ezra Stoller ; introduction by Neil Levine, New York : Princeton Architectural Press, 1999, 
 Frank Lloyd Wright's Fallingwater, photographs by Ezra Stoller ; introduction by Neil Levine, New York : Princeton Architectural Press, 1999, 
 Guggenheim New York, photographs by Ezra Stoller. Guggenheim Bilbao, photographs by Jeff Goldberg, New York : Princeton Architectural Press, 1999, 
 The Seagram Building, photographs by Ezra Stoller ; introduction by Franz Schulze, New York : Princeton Architectural Press, 1999, 
 The Salk Institute, photographs by Ezra Stoller ; introduction by Daniel S. Friedman, New York : Princeton Architectural Press, 1999,
 The United Nations, photographs by Ezra Stoller ; introduction by Jane C. Loeffler, New York : Princeton Architectural Press, 1999, 
 The Chapel of Ronchamp : Le Corbusier's Notre-Dame-du-Haut, photographs by Ezra Stoller ; introduction by Eugenia Bell, New York : Princeton Architectural Press, 1999, 
 Modern Architecture; Photographs by Ezra Stoller, ed. William Saunders, New York ; London : Harry N. Abrams, 1999, 
 The Galveston That Was, Howard Barnstone ; photographs by Henri Cartier-Bresson and Ezra Stoller ; foreword by James Johnson Sweeney ; afterword by Peter Brink, College Station ; Great Britain : Texas A&M University Press ; Houston : Museum of Fine Arts, 1999,

References

External links
 Esto Photographics
 Ezra Stoller, photographs, Canadian Centre for Architecture (digitized items)

Architectural photographers
1915 births
2004 deaths
20th-century American photographers